The 2016 London Marathon was the 36th running of the annual marathon race in London, England, which took place on Sunday, 24 April. The men's elite race was won by Kenyan Eliud Kipchoge and the women's race was won by Kenyan Jemima Sumgong. The men's wheelchair race was won by Marcel Hug from Switzerland and the women's wheelchair race was won by American Tatyana McFadden.

Around 247,069 people applied to enter the race: 53,152 had their applications accepted and 39,523 started the race. These were all record highs for the race. A total of 39,091 runners, 23,983 men and 15,108  women, finished the race.

In the under-17 Mini Marathon, the 3-mile able-bodied and wheelchair events were won by Thomas Mortimer (14:14), Sabrina Sinha (16:23), Jack Agnew (12:18) and Kare Adenegan (13:40).

Course

The London Marathon is run over a largely flat course around the River Thames, and spans 42.195 kilometres (26 miles and 385 yards). The route has markers at one mile and five kilometre intervals.

The course begins at three separate points: the 'red start' in southern Greenwich Park on Charlton Way, the 'green start' in St John's Park, and the 'blue start' on Shooter's Hill Road. The three courses converge after  in Woolwich, close to the Royal Artillery Barracks.

Heading next into Deptford and Surrey Quays in the Docklands, and out towards Bermondsey, competitors race along Jamaica Road before reaching the half-way point as they cross Tower Bridge. Running east again along The Highway through Wapping, competitors head up towards Limehouse and into Mudchute in the Isle of Dogs via Westferry Road, before heading into Canary Wharf.

As the route leads away from Canary Wharf into Poplar, competitors run west down Poplar High Street back towards Limehouse and on through Commercial Road. They then move back onto The Highway, onto Lower and Upper Thames Streets. Heading into the final leg of the race, competitors pass The Tower of London on Tower Hill.  In the penultimate mile along The Embankment, the London Eye comes into view, before the athletes turn right into Birdcage Walk to complete the final , catching the sights of Big Ben and Buckingham Palace, and finishing in The Mall alongside St. James's Palace.

Race summary

The men's race was won by Kenyan Eliud Kipchoge in a new course record, eight seconds shy of the world record. Kipchoge, after running alongside Stanley Biwott for most of the race, broke off to defend the title he won the previous year. The women's race was won by Kenyan Jemima Sumgong, who fell along with two-time winner Mary Keitany and 2010 winner Aselefech Mergia in the latter stages of the race. Sumgong recovered to take the finish line, in front of 2015 winner Tigist Tufa.

Coming less than a week after the Boston Marathon, the same winners won the London wheelchair races. Marcel Hug from Switzerland won the men's wheelchair division and the women's wheelchair division was won by American Tatyana McFadden. Hug won ahead of course record holder Kurt Fearnley and six-time winner David Weir, with the top three finishers each separated by a second. McFadden held off Manuela Schär by a single second to claim her fourth consecutive title, with 2010 winner Wakako Tsuchida coming in third.

Astronaut Tim Peake ran the London Marathon from the International Space Station's treadmill, timed to begin just as the race did. Peake became the first man to run a marathon from space, and the second person after Sunita Williams ran the 2007 Boston Marathon from the ISS.

Results

Men

Women

† = Ran in mass race

Wheelchair men

Wheelchair women

References

Results
Virgin Money London Marathon 2016 Tracking and Results. London Marathon. Retrieved 2020-05-02.
Men Results. Association of Road Racing Statisticians. Retrieved 2020-05-02.
Women Results. Association of Road Racing Statisticians. Retrieved 2020-05-02.

External links 

2016
London Marathon
London Marathon
April 2016 sports events in the United Kingdom